Lepidodactylus manni, also known commonly as the Fiji scaly-toed gecko or the Viti forest gecko, is a species of gecko, a lizard in the family Gekkonidae. The species is endemic to Fiji.

Etymology
The specific name, manni, is in honor of William Montana Mann, who was an American entomologist and zoo director.

Geographic range
L. manni is found on the following islands in Fiji: Kadavu, Rabi, and Viti Levu.

Reproduction
L. manni is oviparous.

References

Further reading
Morrison, Clare (2003). A Field Guide to the Herpetofauna of Fiji. Suva, Fiji: Institute of Applied Sciences, University of the South Pacific. 121 pp.
Schmidt KP (1923). "A List of Fijian Lizards". Copeia 1923 (116): 50–52. (Lepidodactylus manni, new species).

Lepidodactylus
Reptiles described in 1923